{{Infobox Politician
| name          = Mieko Kobayashi
| image         =
| caption       =
| office        = Member of the House of Councillors
| term_start    = 2003 (by-election)
| term_end      = 2007
| predecessor   = 
| successor     = 
| constituency  = 
| majority      = 
| birth_date    = 
| birth_place   = Mie Prefecture
| death_date    = 
| death_place   = 
| party         = Japanese Communist Party
| relations     = 
| residence     = 
| alma_mater    = 
| occupation    = 
| religion      = 
| signature     = 
| website       = 
| footnotes     = 
}}

Mieko Kobayashi (小林 美恵子 Kobayashi Mieko'') is a Japanese politician and member of the House of Councillors for the Japanese Communist Party.

1958 births
Living people
Politicians from Mie Prefecture
Female members of the House of Councillors (Japan)
Members of the House of Councillors (Japan)
Japanese Communist Party politicians